Jonsereds IF is a Swedish football club located in Jonsered, about  east of Gothenburg (Göteborg). The club was founded on 2 May 1923 following the merger of Jonsereds GoIF and Bokedalens IF. Jonsereds IF currently plays in Division 2 Norra Götaland which is the fourth tier of Swedish football. They play their home matches at the Jonsereds IP.

Background
Since their foundation in 1921 Jonsereds IF has participated mainly in the middle divisions of the Swedish football league system. In season of 1923–24, Jonserads were moved to Division 2, Västsvenska Serien. In their first year in the new division, Jonserads finished second behind IFK Uddevalla. They also finished third the next year. Then, after a few years, Jonsereds finished third and were transferred to Division 2 Södra. However, the following season, they finished 10th and were relegated to Division 3. Rebounding quickly, Jonsereds won Division 3 Västsvenska and were promoted to Västra. Their second stint in Division 2 did not progress so quickly and they finished 3rd, 4th, and 3rd again in the next three years. However, their standing quickly fell in the years that followed, and in 1940 they were back in the 3rd Division.

Jonsereds remained in Division 3 until 1966 when they played in Division 4 Göteborg a number of seasons. In the late 1970s they were back in Division 3 and in 1985 they earned a playoff with Skellefteå AIK. Unfortunately for Jonserads they lost the second match 1–0. Undeterred, Jonsereds fought back and three years later, were in Division 1 Södra. They did not fare particularly well, but in 1990 they were transferred to Västra for geographic reasons. After finishing 7th there, they were relegated to Division 2, but immediately promoted again the next season. In 1994, Jonsereds finished 11th in Division 1 Södra, forcing them into a relegation play-off game to keep their place in the division. In the first round of the playoff, they drew with Husqvarna IF 1–1 in the first game, and then won 4–1 in the second, allowing them through to the second round of the playoff. Their next opponent, Norrby IF, beat them 2–0 in the first game, and Jonsereds could not respond, only managing to tie the second game. This loss moved them down a division into Division 2 for the 1995 season.

Season to season

External links

Footnotes

Football clubs in Västra Götaland County
Association football clubs established in 1921
1921 establishments in Sweden